The Birthplace of Ronald Reagan, also known as the Graham Building, is located in an apartment on the second floor of a late 19th-century commercial building in Tampico, Illinois, United States. The building was built in 1896, and housed a tavern from that time until 1915. On February 6, 1911, the future 40th President of the United States, Ronald Reagan, was born in the apartment there. The Reagan family subsequently moved into a house in Tampico a few months later.

Architecturally, the two-story brick building is similar to its neighbors, all of which are part of a historic district added to the U.S. National Register of Historic Places in 1982.

History
In 1896, the building was constructed by Fred Harvey Seymour for G.W. Stauffer, and later became known as the “Graham Building.” From 1896 to 1915, the first floor of the building housed a tavern, while the second floor contained an apartment. On October 1, 1906, Jack and Nelle Reagan moved into the apartment above the tavern. The Reagans had two sons while they lived in the apartment. In 1908,  they had their first son, Neil Reagan. Their second son, Ronald Reagan, was born on February 6, 1911, inside of the second floor apartment. The Reagans lived at the address from 1906 until May 5, 1911, when they moved into a house on Glassburn Street, also in Tampico. While the Reagans lived in Tampico, Jack was employed at the H.C. Pitney Variety Store, which was located across the street from the Reagan Birthplace in the 100 block of Main Street.

The Reagans were in Tampico until Pitney's store closed in 1914, after which they settled in Chicago, Galesburg, and Monmouth for various periods of time. Pitney's store reopened in 1919, and the Reagans returned to Tampico for a short while, where they lived in an apartment above the store. Pitney's store again closed, and on December 6, 1920, the Reagans moved to Dixon, Illinois, where they occupied the house that would later be known as the Ronald Reagan Boyhood Home.

From 1915 to 1919, the building housed a bakery. The First National Bank was located in the structure in 1919, where it remained until 1931. The bank's owner and president, R.F. Woods, served as mayor of Tampico from 1917 to 1919. In 1968, the building was purchased by Paul Nicely and his wife. After Mrs. Nicely died in 2003, the building was put up for sale, and was then purchased by WPW Partners of Chicago.

Architecture

The Reagan Birthplace is similar to most of the commercial buildings along Tampico's Main Street. It is brick, two stories tall, has three second-story windows, and features a cornice. Only the area's oldest buildings differ from the Reagan Birthplace's metal cornices and flat-headed windows.

Significance
The structure known as Ronald Reagan's Birthplace is most notable for being the place where Ronald Reagan was born on February 6, 1911. The building's first floor interior has been restored as the First National Bank, which occupied the property from 1919 to 1931. On the second floor, the apartment's condition has been restored to reflect the historical period when Reagan was born. The site offers tours to the public, and is listed as a “significant” contributing property to the Tampico Main Street Historic District. The Main Street Historic District was added to the U.S. National Register of Historic Places on June 3, 1982.

Footnotes

References
Ward, Michael. "Main Street Historic District", (PDF), National Register of Historic Places Nomination Form, 1 April 1982, HAARGIS Database, Illinois Historic Preservation Agency. Retrieved 10 July 2007.
Picone; Louis L. Where the Presidents Were Born: The History & Preservation of the Presidential Birthplaces (2012)

External links

Information about touring the museum

Houses completed in 1896
Ronald Reagan Trail
Main Street Historic District (Tampico, Illinois)
Ronald Reagan
Historic house museums in Illinois
Museums in Whiteside County, Illinois
Presidential homes in the United States
Historic district contributing properties in Illinois
Reagan family residences
Birthplaces of individual people
National Register of Historic Places in Whiteside County, Illinois